The Suffolk Accident Rescue Service (SARS) is a registered charity which assists the East of England Ambulance Service NHS Trust in providing medical care at the scene of emergencies in Suffolk and surrounding counties.  The organisation relies on volunteer medical professionals and Allied Health Professionals to provide this service on an entirely voluntary basis. The headquarters are in Woolpit. It is an affiliated member of the British Association for Immediate Care.

Purpose of the organisation
SARS was established in 1972 as a group of doctors willing to give up their spare time to assist at the scene of trauma and medical emergencies. In 2011, SARS opened its membership to paramedics and other health professionals.

The service continues to train and equip participating members. By 2017 the charity had answered around 17,000 calls - an average of more than 1 call each day over the previous 45 years. All SARS members are volunteers who receive no payment or expenses for responding to emergency calls and the work is undertaken without any charge to the patient, ambulance service, UK tax-payer or National Lottery funding.

Pre-hospital Care Network in the East of England  
This charity is one of many Pre-hospital care providers in the East, which has an established trauma network – the first to be fully operational in the UK.

Other Pre-hospital care providers that they work and train alongside are:

BASICS Essex Accident Rescue Service (BEARS)  
BASICS Hertfordshire 
Essex & Herts Air Ambulance
Magpas Air Ambulance
East Anglian Air Ambulance

The East of England teams commonly end up working alongside crews from Lincolnshire & Nottinghamshire Air Ambulance, London's Air Ambulance and The Air Ambulance Service, along with other BASICS charities.

References

External links
 
 New car for Suffolk Accident Rescue Service after County Air Ambulance HELP Appeal grant
 Life-saving medical volunteers determined to keep services running during COVID-19 crisis

Emergency medicine organisations
Organisations based in Suffolk
First aid organizations
Organizations established in 1972
Health charities in England
Health in Suffolk